Yakar is a surname and it may refer to:

People with the surname

 Noa Kazado Yakar (born 2003), Israeli acrobatic gymnast
 Rachel Yakar (born 1938), French soprano
 Yaakov ben Yakar (990–1064), German Talmudist
 Judah ben Yakar (born 1201-1218?), talmudist and kabbalist

Other
 Yakar Synagogue, Old Katamon neighborhood of Jerusalem, including the Yakar Center for Social Concern and the Center for Arts and Creativity: an Anglo and Israeli congregation

References